Our Kind of Soul is the seventeenth studio album by Hall & Oates, released in 2004.

This album contains three original tracks and 14 covers of soul hits of the 1960s, 1970s and 1980s. The album is mostly acoustic with some electric guitar and synthesizers. It covers a number of their favorite soul songs.

Track listing
 "Let Love Take Control" (Hall, Oates, Billy Mann) - 3:29
 "Standing in the Shadows of Love" (Lamont Dozier, Eddie Holland, Jr., Brian Holland) - 3:59
 "I'll Be Around" (Thom Bell, Phil Hurtt) - 4:02
 "Used to Be My Girl" (Kenny Gamble, Leon Huff) - 4:00
 "Soul Violins" (Hall, Greg Bieck) - 4:05
 "I Can Dream About You" (Dan Hartman) - 3:16
 "Don't Turn Your Back on Me" (Hall) - 4:50
 "Fading Away" (Warren "Pete" Moore, Smokey Robinson, Robert Rodgers) - 3:39
 "Neither One of Us" (Jim Weatherly) - 4:19
 "After the Dance" (Marvin Gaye, Leon Ware) - 4:11
 "Rock Steady" (Aretha Franklin) - 4:04
 "Love TKO" (Gip Noble, Cecil Womack, Linda Womack) - 5:20
 "What You See Is What You Get" (Anthony Hester) - 4:30
 "Can't Get Enough of Your Love" (Barry White) - 3:48
 "You Are Everything" (Thom Bell, Linda Creed) - 3:55
 "I'm Still in Love with You" (Al Green, Al Jackson, Jr., Willie Mitchell) - 4:06
 "Ooh Child" (Stan Vincent) - 3:51
 "Without You" [Non-US Bonus Track] (Tom Evans, Pete Ham) - 4:23

Personnel 
 Daryl Hall – lead and backing vocals, keyboards, acoustic guitar, string arrangements and conductor (7)
 John Oates – lead and backing vocals, electric guitar
 Greg Bieck – keyboards, synth strings, drum programming, sequencing
 Tom "T-Bone" Wolk – acoustic guitar, electric guitar, bass guitar

Additional personnel 
 David Sancious –  backing vocals (3), keyboards (4, 8, 11, 16)
 Bobby Eli – electric guitar (3, 4, 12, 14)
 Jeff Catania – electric guitar (6, 8)
 Steve Jordan – drums (6, 8, 11, 14)
 Charles DeChant – horns (8, 11, 16)
 Lenny Pickett – horns (8, 11, 16)
 David Spinozza – string arrangements and conductor (1-6, 8-17)
 Stephanie Cummins – cello (1-4, 7, 17)
 Sarah Hewitt-Roth – cello (1-4, 7, 17)
 Cenovia Cummins – violin (1-4, 7, 17)
 Carol Pool – violin (1-4, 7, 17)
 Robert Shaw – violin (1-4, 7, 17), concertmaster (1-4, 7, 17)

Production 
 Produced and Arranged by Daryl Hall, John Oates and Greg Bieck.
 Engineered and Mixed by Greg Bieck 
 Assistant Engineer – Sean Price
 Additional Engineering – Dave O'Donnell, Peter Moshay and Jamie Rosenberg.
 Recorded at A-Pawling Studios (Pawling, NY), Great Divide Studios (Aspen, CO) and The Clubhouse (Los Angeles, CA).
 Mastered by Bob Ludwig at Gateway Mastering (Portland, ME).
 Drum and Studio Technician – Art Smith
 Design Coordinator – Kathy Phillips
 Cover Photo – Elliot Lewis
 Other Photography – Lynn Goldsmith and Justin Wilson
 Track Notes – David Wild

Charts

References

Bibliography

 

2004 albums
Hall & Oates albums
Covers albums